Someday You'll Find Her, Charlie Brown is the 22nd prime-time animated television special based upon the popular comic strip Peanuts, by Charles M. Schulz. It was originally aired on the CBS network on October 30, 1981. 

This is the only time Charlie Brown is voiced by Grant Wehr, which is his only acting career. Wehr failed to reprise his role for the subsequent Peanuts cartoons due to his voice was too course for the character. Michael Mandy returned as Charlie Brown’s voice for the final time in A Charlie Brown Celebration.

Synopsis

Charlie Brown is watching a football game on television when he spots a girl in the stands that just made his heart melt. He is then crushed when the game ends and he feels he may never see her again. Determined to not lose what he feels is his true love, he enlists Linus to help him find her.

They go to the football stadium to try to locate where she was sitting. Charlie remembers she was sitting next to tunnel #13, because that's his lucky number. Then he has Linus sit where he determined she was sitting to recreate the shot in his head. Charlie and Linus try asking someone in the ticket booth who she was but no one knows. Someone there suggests they check the season ticket records downtown and that is where they go. They encounter several girls during the search, but none are the girl they seek.

Finally, they make their way to a property called the Happy Valley Farm (after Charlie himself almost abandons the whole thing because getting there was so far out of town) where the third girl lives. Snoopy and Woodstock are already there, and after Snoopy has some major problems getting across the cattle guard at the intersection of the main driveway, he and Woodstock encounter a rather mean bobcat (similar to the cat that was in Race For Your Life, Charlie Brown) who chases them back across those rollers (where Snoopy has problems again), where they finally meet up with Charlie and Linus. Charlie dismisses Snoopy's attempts to warn him of the bobcat, and he and Linus walk in past the cat petting him as they go... then they both learn for themselves.

Linus learns on the phone of another entrance, and is warned that the bobcat is actually very sweet but does not like strangers much. They finally get to the house, where Linus encounters the correct girl...but then completely forgets about Charlie and falls for her himself (she carries a security blanket similar to his, and reciprocates his feelings for her). He goes off with her, leaving Charlie out in the cold both figuratively and literally. Charlie, after being chased from the yard by the bobcat, decides to just wait...for hours. When Linus at last comes back out, he can't stop talking about how special and great she is (she's invited him to her family barbecue the next day), and is completely oblivious to Charlie's exasperation. Charlie flips through a book of quotes which he carries with him; rather than inspiring him, the sayings he reads only make him feel worse.

Voice cast
Grant Wehr as Charlie Brown
Earl Reilly as Linus Van Pelt
Bill Melendez as Snoopy and Woodstock
Nicole Eggert as First girl
Jennifer Gaffin as Mary Jo
Melissa Strawmeyer as Teenager

Home media
Someday You'll Find Her, Charlie Brown was released to DVD on January 6, 2004 as a bonus feature with the special A Charlie Brown Valentine, and re-released by Warner Home Video on December 28, 2010. Before that, it was released on VHS by Media Home Entertainment on February 14, 1985, Hi-Tops Video in 1989, and Paramount Home Media Distribution on January 11, 1995, along with There's No Time for Love, Charlie Brown.

References

External links
 

1980s animated television specials
CBS television specials
Peanuts television specials
Television shows directed by Phil Roman
1980s American television specials
1981 television specials
1981 in American television